SM Meherob Hasan (born 30 July 2003) is a Bangladeshi cricketer.  He made his List A debut for Gazi Group Cricketers in the 2021-22 Dhaka Premier Division Cricket League on 28 March 2022. Prior to his List A debut, he was named in Bangladesh's squad for the 2022 ICC Under-19 Cricket World Cup. He made his first-class debut on 10 October 2022, for Rajshahi Division in the 2022–23 National Cricket League.

References

External links 

 

2003 births
Living people
Bangladeshi cricketers
Rajshahi Division cricketers